Major Bahadur Singh Baral (15 April 1892 – 16 October 1962) was a national poet of Nepal and a military officer in the First Gorkha Rifle of the British Indian Army. He served as a major in the British Indian Army. He is known for his contributions to Nepali literature. He wrote several poems which comprise "Baral ko Asu", a poem book written by him. It consists of poems of religion, patriotism, equality, social reforms, and the bravery of the Gorkhalis.

Bahadur Singh Baral was born in Chuli Bojha, Deuchuli, of Nawalparasi District. He was well mannered and disciplined as a child. He was always punctual as he was brought up in a military environment. He was a brave and patriotic Gurkha. Both he and his father Sarwajeet Singh Baral were majors in the Second Battalion of the First Gorkha Rifle in the British Indian Army. Bahadur Singh Baral had commandeered the Second Battalion of the First Gorkha Rifle in World War II.

References

1892 births
1962 deaths
Gurkhas
Nepalese male poets
People from Nawalpur District
20th-century poets